Chippokes State Park (previously known as Chippokes Plantation State Park) is located at 695 Chippokes Park Road, Surry, Virginia. It is in a rural, agricultural area off the James River and Route 10 in Surry County, and is protected under the state park system.

History
Chippokes Plantation derives its name from Choapoke, the contact-era weroance of the Quiyoughcohannock people. The Quiyoughcohannock were a part of the Powhatan Paramount Chiefdom, with ancestral lands bounded by Upper Chippokes Creek and Lower Chippokes Creek. There were at least four towns in the nearly 100 square-mile territory, which drew their success from agriculture, trade, and the local waterways. The Quiyoughcohannock lands were ceded to English colonists by 1619.

As an Ancient Planter, a settler who had lived at the Jamestown settlement for 10 years, Captain William Powell was granted the 750-acre Chippokes Plantation tract in 1619 by the Virginia Company. Powell died just four years later in 1623. Chippokes Plantation passed to his infant son, George, in the care of Powell's widow, Margaret Powell Blaney West. When George Powell died childless in his early twenties, the plantation was purchased, sold, and repurchased by Governor William Berkeley. When Berkeley died in 1677, Chippokes passed to his widow, Lady Frances Culpeper Berkeley, who then married Philip Ludwell I.

Ludwells would go on to be proprietors of Chippokes Plantation for nearly 150 years. Notable Ludwells who owned Chippokes Plantation include Philip Ludwell III, the first known Orthodox Christian in America, and his daughter, Lucy Ludwell Paradise. Although she spent most of her life in England, Lucy managed to become close friends with Thomas Jefferson and John and Abigail Adams. After returning home to Virginia in 1805, she inhabited the Ludwell-Paradise House in Williamsburg, which is still standing today.

Chippokes Plantation saw its first non-absentee owner in 1837. Until this point, enslaved workers and paid white overseers lived on the property, while owners lived at a distance. Albert Carroll Jones, a wealthy 22-year-old from Isle of Wight County, first lived at Chippokes in the circa 1830 River House, built as a summer residence by previous owner Charles Osborne. Jones doubled the footprint of the River House in 1847. After his first wife, Anne Baskerville Jones, died in 1850, Albert began constructing a grand Italianate manor, the Jones-Stewart Mansion. Jones lived at Chippokes during and after the Civil War with his daughter, Mary Ann Jones, and his mother, Mary Anne Carroll Jones. Just before the Civil War, when Jones' prosperity as a planter and brandy manufacturer was at its height, Chippokes was home to 47 enslaved individuals, at least one of whom stayed on after the war. Jones died in 1882, leaving the property to pass through the hands of multiple family members before arriving at auction in 1918.

Victor Stewart and Thornton Jeffress, co-proprietors of the Petersburg-based Colonial Pine Company, bought Chippokes at this auction. Their intention was to timber the property, but Victor and his wife, Evelyn, decided to take up residence at Chippokes instead. Starting in the 1920s, the Stewarts restored the historic mansion and formal gardens. With no children to will the property to, the Stewarts instead chose to leave Chippokes Plantation to the Commonwealth of Virginia, with the stipulation that it would become a recreational park. Chippokes Plantation State Park opened to the public in 1970.

Noted for its continued agricultural production, today Chippokes Plantation is one of the oldest continuously farmed properties in North America, having just passed its 400th anniversary. As a State Park, Chippokes offers modern recreational facilities, a swimming pool, visitor center, trails, camping, and cabin rentals. Ranger-led programs include historic house tours, guided hikes, craft workshops, costumed interpretation, and more. The park is also noteworthy for a section of riverfront that exhibits a large amount of miocene and pliocene marine fossil deposits.

Chippokes Farm & Forestry Museum
Opened in June 1990, the Chippokes Farm and Forestry Museum is an open-air farm museum. Exhibits across the five-building complex provide insight into the lives of Tidewater Virginia farmers from 1619 to 1950. Educational displays include reconstructions of historic farmhouse interiors, workshops of rural craftspeople, and traditional agricultural equipment. The museum also highlights the role of forestry in the rural Tidewater economy in the twentieth century. Living exhibits include heritage breed animals and a Cultural Garden, both of which interpret agricultural components of Chippokes Plantation's 400-year history. The museum is self-guided and open for tours the first weekend of March through the first weekend of December.

Walnut Valley Plantation
In 2004, Walnut Valley Plantation was added to Chippokes State Park. Established in 1636, it is a 550-acre plantation adjoining Chippokes Plantation to the southwest. The parcel contains the oldest plantation house in the park, the Walnut Valley House, constructed around 1770. Equally noteworthy is the restored 1816 slave quarter, among the oldest remaining in Virginia. Today, the restored 18th-century house is a secluded lodge available for rental.

References

External links

Chippokes Plantation State Park at Virginia.gov
Chippokes Plantation State Park at Virginia.org
Chippokes Farm and Forestry Museum
Museums USA - Chippokes Farm & Forestry Museum

Museums in Surry County, Virginia
State parks of Virginia
Houses on the National Register of Historic Places in Virginia
Agriculture museums in the United States
Historic house museums in Virginia
Forestry museums in the United States
Plantations in Virginia
Farm museums in Virginia
Protected areas established in 1967
Parks in Surry County, Virginia
Houses in Surry County, Virginia
1967 establishments in Virginia
National Register of Historic Places in Surry County, Virginia
Historic districts on the National Register of Historic Places in Virginia